Christopher Francis Merrie (born 2 November 1998) is an English professional footballer who plays as a midfielder for Tranmere Rovers.

Club career

Wigan Athletic
Merrie joined Wigan Athletic in 2013, after progressing through the Everton youth ranks. On 8 August 2017, Merrie made his Wigan debut during their EFL Cup tie against Blackpool, which resulted in a 2–1 victory for the Latics. On 31 August 2017, Merrie joined National League North side Southport on a season-long loan deal. However, after featuring just five times, scoring once, Wigan recalled him in November 2017.

In March 2018, he joined Altrincham on loan until the end of the season. He helped the club win promotion from the Northern Premier League, scoring one goal in eight games.

Tranmere Rovers
In June 2021, Merrie joined  Tranmere Rovers on a two-year deal.

Career statistics

References

External links

1998 births
Living people
Footballers from Liverpool
English footballers
Association football midfielders
Wigan Athletic F.C. players
Southport F.C. players
Altrincham F.C. players
Tranmere Rovers F.C. players
National League (English football) players
English Football League players
Northern Premier League players